James Henry Hall (born 1914, date of death unknown) was an English footballer who played as a wing half. He made 26 appearances in the Football League for Blackpool and scored one league goal.

Career
Hall made his debut for Joe Smith's Tangerines midway through the 1936–37 campaign, in a Christmas Day 3–0 victory at Fulham. He played in a further seven league games before the end of the season, as well as in both of Blackpool's FA Cup ties against Luton Town. The following season, 1937–38, Hall made thirteen league appearances, mainly deputising for George Farrow. He also scored one goal—in a 1–1 draw with Derby County at Bloomfield Road on 2 October. In 1938–39, Hall's final season with Blackpool, he made five League appearances, the final one being in a 2–1 defeat at Arsenal on 10 April.

References
Specific

General

Cited texts

1914 births
Year of death missing
English footballers
Blackpool F.C. players
English Football League players
Association football wing halves